Andrzej Czyżniewski (28 September 1953 – 9 July 2013) was a Polish footballer who played as a goalkeeper.

Club career
Czyżniewski played 57 games for Arka Gdynia, winning the Polish Cup in 1979, and 95 league matches for Bałtyk Gdynia. He also had a spell abroad in Cyprus.

Retirement
Czyżniewski was a member of the Poland National Team coaching staff as goalkeeping coach in qualifying for the European Championship in 2000. From 1999 to 2001 he was a member of the board and vice president of Arka Gdynia. From 2002 through 2006, he was a goalkeeping coach at Amica Wronki. He moved to Lech Poznan to become director of scouting until 2009. From 2009 to 2012 he served as Director of sports at Arka again.

References

External links
 

1953 births
2013 deaths
Sportspeople from Toruń
Association football goalkeepers
Polish footballers
Bałtyk Gdynia players
Arka Gdynia players
Polish expatriate footballers
Expatriate footballers in Cyprus